Mbipia is a putative genus of haplochromine cichlids which is endemic to Lake Victoria.  This taxa within the genus Mbipia are currently considered by FishBase to be contained within Haplochromis until a comprehensive review of that genus is conducted, however other authorities recognise its validity.

If eventually separated from Haplochromis it would probably contain the following species:
 Mbipia lutea Seehausen & Bouton, 1998
 Mbipia mbipi Lippitsch & Bouton, 1998

References

 
Haplochromini

Cichlid genera
Taxonomy articles created by Polbot